38th London Film Critics' Circle Awards
28 January 2018

Film of the Year: 
Three Billboards Outside Ebbing, Missouri

British/Irish Film of the Year:
Dunkirk

The 38th London Film Critics' Circle Awards, honouring the best in film for 2017, were announced by the London Film Critics' Circle on 28 January 2018 at The May Fair Hotel, in Mayfair, London. The nominations were announced on 19 December 2017. Actor-filmmakers Alice Lowe and Steve Oram returned to host the ceremony for the third consecutive year.

Winners and nominees

Film of the Year
Three Billboards Outside Ebbing, Missouri
 Call Me by Your Name
 Dunkirk
 The Florida Project
 Get Out
 God's Own Country
 Lady Bird
 Loveless
 Phantom Thread
 The Shape of Water

Foreign Language Film of the Year
Elle
 Aquarius
 The Handmaiden
 Loveless
 Raw

British/Irish Film of the Year
Dunkirk
 God's Own Country
 Lady Macbeth
 Paddington 2
 Three Billboards Outside Ebbing, Missouri

Documentary of the Year
I Am Not Your Negro
 78/52
 Human Flow
 Jane
 The Work

Actor of the Year
Timothée Chalamet – Call Me by Your Name
 Daniel Day-Lewis – Phantom Thread
 James Franco – The Disaster Artist
 Daniel Kaluuya – Get Out
 Gary Oldman – Darkest Hour

Actress of the Year
Frances McDormand – Three Billboards Outside Ebbing, Missouri
 Annette Bening – Film Stars Don't Die in Liverpool
 Sally Hawkins – The Shape of Water
 Isabelle Huppert – Elle
 Florence Pugh – Lady Macbeth

Supporting Actor of the Year
Hugh Grant – Paddington 2
 Willem Dafoe –The Florida Project
 Woody Harrelson – Three Billboards Outside Ebbing, Missouri
 Sam Rockwell – Three Billboards Outside Ebbing, Missouri
 Michael Stuhlbarg – Call Me by Your Name

Supporting Actress of the Year
Lesley Manville – Phantom Thread
 Lily Gladstone – Certain Women
 Holly Hunter – The Big Sick
 Allison Janney – I, Tonya
 Laurie Metcalf – Lady Bird

British/Irish Actor of the Year
Daniel Kaluuya – Get Out
 Daniel Day-Lewis – Phantom Thread
 Colin Farrell – The Beguiled / The Killing of a Sacred Deer
 Josh O'Connor – God's Own Country
 Gary Oldman – Darkest Hour / The Space Between Us

British/Irish Actress of the Year
Sally Hawkins – The Shape of Water / Maudie / Paddington 2
 Emily Beecham – Daphne
 Judi Dench – Victoria & Abdul / Murder on the Orient Express
 Florence Pugh – Lady Macbeth
 Saoirse Ronan – Lady Bird / Loving Vincent

Young British/Irish Performer of the Year
Harris Dickinson – Beach Rats
 Tom Holland – The Lost City of Z / Spider-Man: Homecoming
 Noah Jupe – Suburbicon / Wonder / The Man with the Iron Heart
 Dafne Keen – Logan
 Fionn Whitehead – Dunkirk

Director of the Year
Sean Baker – The Florida Project
 Guillermo del Toro – The Shape of Water
 Luca Guadagnino – Call Me by Your Name
 Martin McDonagh – Three Billboards Outside Ebbing, Missouri
 Christopher Nolan – Dunkirk

Screenwriter of the Year
Martin McDonagh – Three Billboards Outside Ebbing, Missouri
 Paul Thomas Anderson – Phantom Thread
 Greta Gerwig – Lady Bird
 James Ivory – Call Me by Your Name
 Jordan Peele – Get Out

Breakthrough British/Irish Filmmaker
Francis Lee – God's Own Country
 Alice Birch – Lady Macbeth
 Simon Farnaby – Paddington 2 / Mindhorn
 Rungano Nyoni – I Am Not a Witch
 William Oldroyd – Lady Macbeth

British/Irish Short Film
We Love Moses – Dionne Edwards
 The Cloud of Unknowing – Mike Hannon
 The Dog and the Elephant – Mike Sharpe
 Tuesday – Charlotte Wells
 Your Mother and I – Anna Maguire

Technical Achievement
Blade Runner 2049 – Dennis Gassner, production design
 Baby Driver – Darrin Prescott, stunts
 Dunkirk – Hans Zimmer, music
 God's Own Country – Joshua James Richards, cinematography
 Lady Macbeth – Holly Waddington, costumes
 The Lost City of Z – Darius Khondji, cinematography
 The Love Witch – Emma Willis, hair & makeup
 Paddington 2 – Pablo Grillo, visual effects
 Phantom Thread – Mark Bridges, costumes
 Star Wars: The Last Jedi – Ben Morris, visual effects

Dilys Powell Award
 Kate Winslet

References

2
2017 film awards
2017 in British cinema
2017 in London
January 2018 events in the United Kingdom